Alexander Petrovich Sumarokov (Moscow – , Moscow) was a Russian poet and playwright who single-handedly created classical theatre in Russia, thus assisting Mikhail Lomonosov to inaugurate the reign of classicism in Russian literature.

Life and works 
Born of a  family of Muscovite gentry, Sumarokov was educated at the Cadet School in St. Petersburg, where he acquired an intimate familiarity with French polite learning. Neither an aristocratic dilettante like Antiokh Kantemir nor a learned professor like Vasily Trediakovsky, he was the first gentleman in Russia to choose the profession of letters. He consequently may be called the father of the Russian literary profession. His pursuits did not undermine his position in the family; indeed, his grandson was made a count and, when the Sumarokov family became extinct a century later, the title eventually passed to Prince Felix Yusupov, who also held the title of  Count Sumarokov-Elston.

Sumarokov wrote much and regularly, chiefly in those literary genres neglected by Lomonosov. His principal importance rests in his plays, among which Khorev (1749) is regarded as the first regular Russian drama. He ran the first permanent public theatre in the Russian capital, where he worked with the likes of Fyodor Volkov and Ivan Dmitrievsky. His plays were based on the subjects taken from Russian history (Dmitry Samozvanets), proto-Russian legends (Khorev) or on Shakespearean plots (Makbet, Hamlet).

D.S. Mirsky believed that there could be no doubt "the good acting made the reputation of Sumarokov, as the literary value of his plays is small. His tragedies are a stultification of the classical method; their Alexandrine couplets are exceedingly harsh; their characters are marionettes. His comedies are adaptations of French plays, with a feeble sprinkling of Russian traits. Their dialogue is a stilted prose that had never been spoken by anyone and reeked of translation".

Sumarokov's non-dramatic work is by no means negligible. His fables are the first attempt in a genre that was destined to flourish in Russia with particular vigor. His satires, in which he occasionally imitates the manner of popular poetry, are racy and witty attacks against the government clerks and officers of law. His songs, of all his writings, still attract readers of poetry. They are remarkable for a prodigious metrical inventiveness and a genuine gift of melody. In subject matter they are entirely within the pale of classical, conventional love poetry.

Sumarokov's literary criticism is usually carping and superficial. But it nonetheless did much to inculcate on the Russian public the canons of classical taste. He was a loyal follower of Voltaire, with whom he prided himself on having exchanged several letters. Amanda Ewington has argued that Sumarokov was not only influenced by Voltaire as such but accessed a wide variety of European influences, from Shakespeare to Lope de Vega, through the conduit of Voltaire.  Vain and self-conscious, Sumarokov considered himself a Russian Racine and Voltaire in one. In personal relations he was irritable, touchy, and often petty. But his exacting touchiness contributed, almost as much as did Lomonosov's calm dignity, to raise the profession of the pen and to give it a definite place in society.

Opera libretti
The first opera written in Russian was  Цефал и Прокрис (Tsefal i Prokris – Cephalus and Prokris, libretto by Alexander Sumarokov) by Italian composer Francesco Araja serving to the Russian Court. The opera was staged at St. Petersburg on March 7, [OS February 27], 1755.

The second opera set to a Russian text was Альцеста (Altsesta – Alceste, 1758, libretto by Alexander Sumarokov) by German composer Hermann Raupach (1728–1778) also serving to the Russian Court.

References

Notes

External links
Alexander Sumarokov Poems

1717 births
1777 deaths
Dramatists and playwrights from the Russian Empire
Poets from the Russian Empire
Male writers from the Russian Empire
Russian opera librettists
Russian male poets
18th-century poets from the Russian Empire
18th-century dramatists and playwrights
Russian male dramatists and playwrights
Writers from Moscow
18th-century male writers